Miguel Peidró Barcos was a Spanish footballer who played as a forward. The dates of his birth and death are unknown.

Club career
Throughout his career, he was part of numerous teams based in Catalonia, going from Espanyol to CE Europa, and from two spells at UE Sants to three spells at FC Espanya (in the latter two the club was now under the name of FC Gràcia), and at the end of his career, he played for FC Lleida and Alumnes Obrers de Vilanova (Vilanova Workers' Students Association). As a member of this club, he was suspended for six months for allegedly assaulting a referee in 1930. He also played four friendly matches with FC Barcelona during the spring of 1924, scoring 2 goals.

International career
He represented the Catalonia national team 3 times, one of which being in the replay of the infamous final of the 1923-24 Prince of Asturias Cup, replacing Juan Feliu to help Catalonia beat a Castille/Madrid XI 3-2.

Honours

International
Catalonia

Prince of Asturias Cup:
Champions (1): 1923-24

References

Date of birth unknown
Date of death unknown
Spanish footballers
Footballers from Catalonia
Association football forwards
UE Sants players
CE Europa footballers
RCD Espanyol footballers
FC Barcelona players
Lleida Esportiu footballers
Catalonia international footballers